House of Hiranandani, formerly Hiranandani Upscale, is an integrated township consisting of several skyscraper condominiums in Chennai, India. Located on Old Mahabalipuram Road, the towers were the first buildings to cross the 100-meter mark in Chennai.

History
The construction of the towers began in 2008 and the first tower was completed in 2011.

Location
The complex is located on Old Mahabalipuram Road at Egattur in South Chennai.

The towers
Built on a 120-acre plot, the complex consists of 13 high-rise towers ranging from 25 floors to 46 floors.

Four more towers are planned within the complex. In all, there are about 2100 apartments in the complex. There is also a school within the complex.

The towers within the complex are listed in the table below:

See also

 List of tallest buildings in Chennai

References

External links
 Official website of the apartment complex

Skyscraper residential buildings in Chennai
Residential buildings completed in 2011